Shah Jahan Regency is an  Indian Bengali drama film directed by Srijit Mukherji, under the banner of SVF Entertainment Pvt Ltd, starring Abir Chatterjee, Parambrata Chatterjee, Anjan Dutt,  Mamata Shankar, Anirban Bhattacharya, Swastika Mukherjee, Rudranil Ghosh and Rittika Sen while Rituparna Sengupta and Babul Supriyo appear in Guest appearances. The movie, based on the popular novel Chowringhee by Mani Shankar Mukherjee, was released on 18 January 2019.

Plot
The movie is based on the well-known novel Chowringhee by popular Bengali author Mani Shankar Mukherjee (Sankar). The 1968 film Chowringhee is an iconic Bengali film, based on the namesake novel, and starring Supriya Devi, Uttam Kumar, Subhendu Chatterjee,Anjana Bhowmik , Utpal Dutt and Biswajit.

Cast

 Anjan Dutt as Makaranda Paul, owner of Shah Jahan Regency
 Mamata Shankar as Mrs Sarkar, mother of Arnab Sarkar
 Rudranil Ghosh as Barun Raha
 Abir Chatterjee as Samiran Bose
 Parambrata Chatterjee as Rudra Mukherjee
 Anirban Bhattacharya as Arnab Sarkar
 Swastika Mukherjee as Kamalini Guha, a Suite Hostess and escort of Mr. Agarwal
 Rittika Sen as Supreeta Mitra, an airhostess
 Rituparna Sengupta as Gayatri Chakraborti, in a Guest appearance
 Babul Supriyo as Mr. Agarwal, a rich businessman in a Guest appearance
 Kanchan Mullick as Dhananjoy 'Dheno' Chatterjee, maternal uncle of Arnab Sarkar
 Pallavi Chatterjee as Mrs. Mala Paul
 Sujoy Prosad Chatterjee as Nitya Banerjee aka Nitty-gritty
 Ushasie Chakraborty as Disha

Release
The official trailer of the film was launched by SVF on 20 December 2018.

Soundtrack

The soundtrack was composed by Anupam Roy and Prasen on lyrics of Anupam Roy, Dipangshu Acharya and Ritam Sen.

References

External links
 

Films directed by Srijit Mukherji
Indian drama films
Bengali-language Indian films
2010s Bengali-language films
Films scored by Anupam Roy
Films scored by Prasen
Films based on works by Mani Shankar Mukherjee
Films based on Indian novels